Antique Airfield is a private use airfield located three miles northeast of Blakesburg, Iowa. Antique Airfield is owned and operated by Robert L. Taylor and the Airpower Museum. It is the home of the Antique Airplane Association, Inc., the Airpower Museum, Inc., and the APM Library of Flight.

References

Airports in Iowa
Transportation buildings and structures in Wapello County, Iowa
Airports for antique aircraft